The Top League Championship is Japan's highest-level knockout tournament for rugby union clubs. Held annually, the leading teams from the Top League regular season qualify for the playoffs to decide the Cup title. From 2018 onward, the All-Japan Rugby Football Championship has doubled as the Top League Championship Cup. Previously, teams competed for the Lixil Cup, from 2014 to 2016, and Microsoft Cup (prior to 2009).

The Top League competition is a Japanese industrial league that presently consists of sixteen teams, all owned by major companies.

Initially sponsored by Microsoft Japan, the knockout tournament was first contested by the top eight teams from the Top League in 2004. It was considered a separate competition to the Top League for the first three seasons but was officially integrated for the 2006–07 season. The number of teams was also cut to four to give a format of two semi-finals and a final, and from that time onward until the 2016–17 season the winner of the knockout cup was recognised as the Top League champion.

There were no title-play-offs in 2016–17, and the team on top of the league after the round-robin stage won the Top League title.

Overall
Summary totals for all Top League championships up to and including 2018:

Notes:

1The Panasonic Wild Knights summary includes results for the Sanyo Wild Knights from 2003 to 2012.
*NEC won the 2004 Microsoft Cup but Kobe Steel was the Top League champion. These were separate competitions prior to 2007.
^The 2004 Kobe Steel and Sanyo (Panasonic) semi-final appearances are included, although that cup was not part of the championship.
+Yamaha was 3rd and Suntory 4th in the 2003–04 Top League championship, but these results are not counted as semi-final appearances.

Tournaments
Teams listed are those that qualified from the Top League for the title play-offs in each season, or the top four teams where there were no play-offs. Results of the play-offs are written so that the score of the team in each row is mentioned first. 

Suntory Sungoliath	12–8	Panasonic Wild Knights

Top League and All-Japan titles: 2017 onward
There were no title-play-offs in 2018, and the team on top of the league after the round-robin stage was crowned the Top League title winner. However, the top three teams progressed to the All-Japan Championship.

The All-Japan Championship doubled as the Top League Champions Cup title from 2018 onward, with university teams excluded.

Lixil Cup and Top League title: 2014 to 2016
From the 2013–14 season, the Top League tournament was contested by sixteen teams. The top four teams from the league competition (or the top eight in 2016) advanced to the play-offs to compete for the Lixil Trophy and Top League Championship.

Play-offs and Top League title: 2010 to 2013

Microsoft Cup and Top League title: 2007 to 2009
For the 2006–07 season the tournament was expanded to fourteen teams and the Top League and Microsoft Cup competitions were combined. Only the top four teams on the regular season table progressed to title play-offs and the winner of the knockout competition was awarded both the Microsoft Cup and the Top League title.

Video referee (TMO) decisions were introduced for the 2009 Cup series. The naming rights partnership with Microsoft for the knockout competition ended after the 2009 Cup final.

Top League, separate Microsoft Cup: 2004 to 2006
For the first three seasons the competition format was a single round-robin tournament contested by twelve teams, with the team finishing top of the table winning the Top League title. The Microsoft Cup was a separate knockout competition for the top eight teams in the league.

Notes:
 Toshiba Brave Lupus won the Top League and Microsoft Cup double.

 The number of tries and goals being equal, the result was decided in favour of Yamaha over Toyota by a lottery at Hanazono after the game.

 Reigning Microsoft Cup holders the NEC Green Rockets were knocked out at the quarter final stage.

 In 2003–04, Kobe Steel won the Top League but NEC won the Microsoft Cup. The League and Cup were separate competitions prior to 2007.

See also 
Top League
All-Japan Rugby Football Championship
Japan Rugby Football Union
Japan national rugby union team

References

External links
JRFU Official Site (in English)
Top League Official Site (in Japanese)

Microsoft events
Recurring sporting events established in 2004
2004 establishments in Japan
Lixil Group
Rugby union competitions in Japan